Rebola is a town in Equatorial Guinea.

Location and population

It is the capital of the province of Bioko Norte. 

It has a (2001 est.) population of 8,259.

See also

 Geography of Equatorial Guinea

Populated places in Bioko Norte
Bioko